Huggy Bear may refer to:

 a character played by Antonio Fargas on the 1970s TV show Starsky & Hutch, or the same character played by Snoop Dogg in the 2004 film.
 Huggy Bear (band), an early 1990s riot grrrl band
 college basketball coach Bob Huggins
 NHL defenceman Quinn Hughes